Love Never Dies (Spanish: El amor nunca muere) is a 1955 Argentine romantic drama film directed by Luis César Amadori, written by Amadori with Pedro Miguel Obligado and starring Zully Moreno, Tita Merello, Mirtha Legrand and Alfredo Alcón.

Cast 
 Zully Moreno
 Mirtha Legrand
 Tita Merello
 Carlos Cores
 Duilio Marzio
 Alfredo Alcón
 José De Angelis
 Héctor Méndez
 Enrique Chaico
 Carmen Monteleone
 Herminia Franco
 Juan Bono
 Benito Cibrián
 Marta González (Uncredited)
 José Maurer
 Aída Villadeamigo

External links 
 

1955 films
Argentine black-and-white films
1955 romantic drama films
1950s Spanish-language films
Films directed by Luis César Amadori
Argentine romantic drama films
1950s Argentine films